Anthoceros neesii is a species of hornwort in the Anthocerotaceae family. It is found in Austria, the Czech Republic, Germany, and Poland. Its natural habitat is unknown; today it is only found growing in crop fields.

References

Hornworts
Endangered plants
Taxonomy articles created by Polbot